The Glenn Miller Story is a 1954 American biographical film about the eponymous American band-leader, directed by Anthony Mann and starring James Stewart in their second non-western collaboration.

Plot
The film follows big band leader Glenn Miller (1904–1944) (James Stewart) from his early days in the music business in 1929 through to his 1944 death when the airplane he was flying in was lost over the English Channel during World War II. Prominent placement in the film is given to Miller's courtship and marriage to Helen Burger (June Allyson), and various cameos by actual musicians who were colleagues of Miller.

Several turning points in Miller's career are depicted with varying degrees of accuracy, including: the success of an early jazz band arrangement; his departure from the Broadway pit and sideman work to front a band of his own; the failure of his first band on the road; and the subsequent re-forming of his successful big band and the establishment of the "Miller Sound" as typified by "Moonlight Serenade". Also depicted is Miller's international success touring his band in support of the Allies in World War II.

There are several anachronisms in the picture. When the military band led by Miller is playing in front of General "Hap" Arnold, a B-29 bomber is in the background. The marching troops are desegregated, which did not occur until 1948. Scenes ostensibly shot in England are clearly staged in the U.S., as witness the presence of RCA Type 44 microphones during a BBC broadcast. In reality, the BBC could not afford them and commissioned its own, cheaper version.

In addition, several key plot points are either highly fictionalized from actual events or were invented for the film:
 Miller is shown as disliking the tune "Little Brown Jug" and only performing it in 1944 as a "special arrangement" for his wife. The song was actually first performed and recorded in 1939, became one of his most popular early hits, and was performed numerous times by both the civilian and AAF Orchestras. The 1939 recording went on to sell over a million copies.
 Miller was, in fact, dressed down for performing jazz marches and told by a superior officer that Sousa's marches served the military well in World War I. However, in the film, his character apologizes sheepishly and is only rescued by General Arnold whose children are fans. Miller's biographer George T. Simon states that his actual response was "Are you still flying the same planes you flew in the last war?", after which the jazz marches stayed.
 Neither Frances Langford nor the Modernaires performed with Miller's Army Air Force Band.

Cast
 James Stewart as Glenn Miller (trombone dubbed by Joe Yukl and Murray McEachern)
 June Allyson as Helen Burger Miller
 Harry Morgan as Chummy MacGregor (billed as Henry Morgan)
 Charles Drake as Don Haynes
 George Tobias as Si Shribman
 Barton MacLane as Gen. Henry H. Arnold, USAAF
 Sig Ruman as W Kranz
 Irving Bacon as Mr. Miller
 James Bell as Mr. Burger
 Kathleen Lockhart as Mrs. Miller 
 Marion Ross as Polly Haynes
 Nino Tempo as Wilbur Schwartz (clarinet playing dubbed by Wilbur Schwartz)

Cameo appearances
The following artists all appeared as themselves (listed alphabetically):

 Louis Armstrong
 Johnny Best
 Barney Bigard
 Cozy Cole
 Ray Conniff
 Gene Krupa
 Frances Langford
 The Modernaires
 Ben Pollack
 Babe Russin
 Arvell Shaw
 Trummy Young

Production
Universal-International's first public announcements, early in 1953, employed the soon-discarded title, "Moonlight Serenade."

This is the second of three movies that paired Jimmy Stewart and June Allyson, the others being The Stratton Story and Strategic Air Command.

Release
The film opened in New York City on February 10, 1954.

Reissues
The film was re-released in 1960.

An alternate cut of the film, running 3–4 minutes shorter than the original theatrical release was re-released in 1985 with a stereo soundtrack. The film was originally recorded in stereo but was initially released in mono. It was screened out of competition at the 1985 Cannes Film Festival.

Home media
The film was originally released on home video in the VHS format in 1986. On March 4, 2003, the film was released onto DVD with an anamorphic display, remastered surround sound, and subtitles. The film can also be found in a James Stewart DVD collection that was released in 2007.

The film was released on Blu-ray in Germany on July 24, 2014.

Shout Factory released the film on Blu-ray in the United States on November 20, 2018. This release includes both the original theatrical version, at 1h 56m, and the 1985 alternate cut, running 1h 52m. A detailed comparison of the differences in the two versions can be found at movie-censorship.com.

Reception

The critical reception to The Glenn Miller Story was generally positive. The film holds an 88% rating on Rotten Tomatoes based on 8 reviews.

Box-office
Upon release in 1954, The Glenn Miller Story was massively successful at the box-office and earned theatrical rentals of over $7 million, placing it third for the year behind White Christmas and The Caine Mutiny. It was Universal's highest-grossing film overseas, with rentals of $5 million, for worldwide rentals of $12 million.

Stewart took a percentage of the profits. In 1955, William Goetz estimated that Stewart had earned $2 million from the film.

Awards
In 1954, the film was nominated for three Academy Awards, including Best Screenplay (by Valentine Davies and Oscar Brodney) and Best Score (by Henry Mancini and Joseph Gershenson). The film won the Academy Award for Best Sound Recording, by Leslie I. Carey.

Music
Glenn Miller Orchestra pianist John "Chummy" MacGregor was a technical advisor on the movie. Composer Henry Mancini composed the musical score with Joseph Gershenson, who conducted the Universal-International studio orchestra's recreations of Miller's arrangements on the soundtrack. Miller's band was portrayed by The Airmen of Note, an ensemble of the United States Air Force Band originally created in 1950 to carry on the Glenn Miller tradition.

The soundtrack included many big band pieces originally performed by Glenn Miller's orchestra.

 "Moonlight Serenade"
 "Tuxedo Junction"
 "Little Brown Jug"
 "St. Louis Blues March"
 "Basin Street Blues"
 "In the Mood"
 "A String of Pearls"
 "Pennsylvania 6-5000"
 "American Patrol"
 "Otchi-Tchor-Ni-Ya"

Musical cameos
The film contains songs by musicians who also make cameo appearances in the film. These cameos include: Louis Armstrong, Barney Bigard, Cozy Cole, Ray Conniff, Gene Krupa, Frances Langford, Skeets McDonald, The Modernaires, Marty Napoleon, Ben Pollack, Babe Russin, Arvell Shaw, and James Young.

Billboard charts
The original soundtrack to the movie, The Glenn Miller Story---Sound Track, Decca DL 5519 (USA)/BML 8647 (UK), was number one for 10 weeks on the Billboard albums chart in 1954. The 1954 album contained eight selections. The soundtrack was re-released with an expanded track list. The album Glenn Miller Plays Selections From the Film "The Glenn Miller Story" was number one for 11 weeks on the Billboard albums chart the same year, released as RCA Victor LPT 3057. The original 1954 album contained eight selections. An expanded version of the latter album was certified Gold in 1961 by the RIAA.

A tribute album I Remember Glenn Miller, Capitol H 476, by Ray Anthony was number nine on the same Billboard album chart for that week. The extended play versions of the same albums also reached the same position on the Billboard EP charts for that week. The Modernaires released a 45 single on Coral Records, 9-61110, "A Salute to Glenn Miller," which included medleys in two parts from the movie soundtrack, Parts 1 and 2: (I've Got a Gal In) Kalamazoo/Moonlight Cocktail/Elmer's Tune/Moonlight Serenade/Chattanooga Choo Choo/String of Pearls/Serenade in Blue/At Last/Perfidia, that reached number 29 on the Billboard charts in 1954.

See also
 Glenn Miller Orchestra
 Swing music
 Bandleader

References

External links
 
 
 Awards won by The Glenn Miller Story
 Review of The Glenn Miller Story at The Shelf

1954 films
1950s biographical films
1954 musical films
American biographical films
Biographical films about musicians
1950s English-language films
Films that won the Best Sound Mixing Academy Award
Films directed by Anthony Mann
Universal Pictures films
Jazz films
Films set in the 1920s
Films set in the 1930s
Films about the United States Army Air Forces
Films set in New York City
Films scored by Henry Mancini
Cultural depictions of jazz musicians
Cultural depictions of American men
1950s American films